Archbishop Daniel (real name Volodymyr Olegovych Zelinsky; ; born September 28, 1972) is a Ukrainan-American Orthodox hierarch who is the Archbishop of Pamphylia and of the Western Eparchy of the Ukrainian Orthodox Church of the USA (UOC of USA) since 2008.

Early life and education
Zelinsky was born on September 28, 1972 in Ivano-Frankivsk, Ukraine to a family of teachers and grew up in Buchach. After graduating from high school, in September 1993 he entered the first year of the Ivano-Frankivsk Uniate Seminary. In 1996, he emigrated to the United States, where he attended the Catholic University of America and later the Dominican House of Studies, both located in Washington, D.C.. At this point in time, he was ordained a deacon.

Ordination
On May 12, 2001, Zelinsky was ordained a priest by Archbishop Anthony at the St. Andrew Memorial Church in South Bound Brook, New Jersey. There, on June 1, Zelinsky was appointed head of the Consistory Public Relations Department and registrar. On May 22, 2002, he was ordained a monk by Anthony under the name Daniel, which took place at the Ukrainian monastery of St. Elijah in Dover, Florida. On October 3, 2007, Daniel was elevated to archimandrite. Later that month, he was elected for elevation to bishop.

Episcopacy
On May 9, 2008, Daniel was ordained as a bishop. The following day, he was also consecrated Bishop of Pamphylia. In October 2008, he was elected head of the Western Eparchy.

On September 7, 2018, as part of the Autocephaly of the Orthodox Church of Ukraine, Daniel was appointed Exarch of the Ecumenical Patriarch in Ukraine.

Notes

1972 births
Living people
People from Ivano-Frankivsk
Ukrainian Orthodox Church of the USA bishops
Ukrainian emigrants to the United States
American Christian monks